Arquà Polesine is a comune (municipality) in the Province of Rovigo in the Italian region Veneto, located about  southwest of Venice and about  southwest of Rovigo.

Arquà Polesine borders the following municipalities: Bosaro, Costa di Rovigo, Frassinelle Polesine, Polesella, Rovigo, Villamarzana.

Sights include the castle, built in 1146 by Guglielmo III degli Adelardi Marcheselli, lord of Ferrara, and the parish church (rebuilt around 1516).

Twin towns 
Arquà Polesine is twinned with:

  Vourles, France.

References 

Cities and towns in Veneto
Articles which contain graphical timelines